Jalpaiguri Law College is a college imparting legal education in Jalpaiguri, West Bengal. It was established in the year 1981. It is the only government aided Law College in the entire District and its neighboring District of Cooch Behar. The college is affiliated to University of North Bengal. This college is also approved by the Bar Council of India.

Courses 
The college offers a five-years integrated B.A. LL.B (Hons) course & BA LL.B (Genl.) Course. The college also offers LL.M from the year of 2020.

See also

References

External links 
 
 University of North Bengal
 University Grants Commission
 National Assessment and Accreditation Council

Law schools in West Bengal
Universities and colleges in Jalpaiguri district
Colleges affiliated to University of North Bengal
Educational institutions established in 1981
1981 establishments in West Bengal